HMAS Kalgoorlie (J192/B245/A119), named for the city of Kalgoorlie, was one of 60 Bathurst-class corvettes constructed during World War II and one of 20 built for the Admiralty but manned by personnel of and commissioned into the Royal Australian Navy (RAN).

Design and construction

In 1938, the Australian Commonwealth Naval Board (ACNB) identified the need for a general purpose 'local defence vessel' capable of both anti-submarine and mine-warfare duties, while easy to construct and operate. Construction of the prototype  did not go ahead, but the plans were retained. The need for locally built 'all-rounder' vessels at the start of World War II saw the "Australian Minesweepers" (designated as such to hide their anti-submarine capability, but popularly referred to as "corvettes") approved in September 1939, with 60 constructed during the course of the war: 36 ordered by the RAN, 20 (including Kalgoorlie) ordered by the British Admiralty but manned and commissioned as RAN vessels, and four for the Royal Indian Navy.

Kalgoorlie was laid down by BHP at its Whyalla shipyard on 27 July 1940. She was launched on 7 August 1941 by the wife of Premier of South Australia Thomas Playford IV, and was commissioned into the RAN on 7 April 1942.

Operational history

RAN service
After completing trials, Kalgoorlie was assigned as a convoy escort. Initially operating along the east coast of Sydney, the corvette was moved to Darwin in August 1942 and taken with convoys between Australia, Thursday Island and Timor. On 25 September, Kalgoorlie and sister ship  evacuated the ship's company of the destroyer , which had run aground at Betano Bay two days before. In early December, Kalgoorlie was involved in the search for survivors from her sister ship , which had been sunk by Japanese aircraft on 1 December. Kalgoorlie eventually recovered 49 of the survivors.

In April 1943, the corvette returned to the east coast of Australia, still operating as a convoy escort. The United States Army Transport Portmar and the US Navy Landing ship  were torpedoed by Japanese submarine I-174: the former sinking in minutes with the loss of only two lives, while 26 were killed aboard the latter ship, which survived and was towed to port. Despite attempts to locate the submarine immediately after the attack, and a multiple-day search performed by Kalgoorlie, I-174 escaped unharmed. This was the last submarine attack to be made on the east coast of Australia during World War II.

Kalgoorlie spent the first half of 1944 as a convoy escort between Queensland and New Guinea, then joined sister ship  in clearing the minefields laid by  throughout the Great Barrier Reef during the early part of the war. During August and September, the two corvettes located and destroyed almost 500 mines. Kalgoorlie spent the rest of the year on convoy escort duties, before joining the British Pacific Fleet at the end of 1944. The corvette operated with the Pacific Fleet until 15 July 1945, when she arrived in Brisbane for a refit. Kalgoorlie was still undergoing refit when the war ended. After the refit, the corvette operated in New Guinea and Australian waters until early May 1946.

The corvette was awarded four battle honours for her wartime service: "Darwin 1942–43", "Pacific 1942–43", "New Guinea 1943–44", and "Okinawa 1945".

Kalgoorlie paid off on 8 May 1946, and was recommissioned on the same day into the Royal Netherlands Navy as HNLMS Ternate. It was scrapped in Japan in 1962.

Citations

References
Books

Journal and news articles

External links

Bathurst-class corvettes of the Royal Australian Navy
Minehunters of the Royal Netherlands Navy
Ships built in South Australia
World War II corvettes of Australia
1941 ships